Guy Delcourt (born 27 March 1958) is a French editor, founder of the Delcourt publishing house in 1986. It has since grown into one of the largest publishers of comics in France.

The company grew from publishing three titles in 1986, to over 200 in 2006. With over 1200 titles by the end 2005, Delcourt's success has not been based on the popularity of a single series. Leading titles in 2006 included Sillage (850,000 sold), Aquablue (792,000 sold), Fruits Basket (750,000 sold), De Cape et de Crocs/Garulfo (743,000 sold), Le Chant des Stryges (670,000 sold), Dungeon (comics) (634,000 ex), Star Wars (540,000), Carmen & Travis (480,000), Golden City (435,000), Les Blagues de Toto (350,000 ex), Nana (315,000). These accounted for 47% of turnover in 2006, with Manga accounting for 35% and new releases for 16%.

References

1958 births
Living people
French editors
Knights of the Ordre national du Mérite
Place of birth missing (living people)
French company founders
French male non-fiction writers